The 2021 Hungarian Grand Prix (officially known as the Formula 1 Rolex Magyar Nagydíj 2021) was a Formula One motor race held on 1 August 2021 at the Hungaroring in Mogyoród, Hungary. It was the eleventh round of the 2021 Formula One World Championship. The race was won by Esteban Ocon for Alpine-Renault. The win was Ocon's first in Formula One, the first win for the Enstone-based team since the 2013 Australian Grand Prix, and the first win for a Renault-badged engine since the 2014 Belgian Grand Prix, with Hamilton and Carlos Sainz Jr. completing the podium after Sebastian Vettel was disqualified from second. Pierre Gasly earned the fastest lap, while Williams scored their first double points finish since the 2018 Italian Grand Prix and their first points of any kind since the 2019 German Grand Prix.

Background
The event, which was held over the weekend of 30 July – 1 August at the Hungaroring, was the eleventh round of the 2021 World Championship, marking the thirty-sixth time the Hungarian Grand Prix has appeared on the World Championship calendar. Additional debris fencing was installed at the thirteenth corner before the event, while minor modifications were made to the pit lane entrance and exit.

Championship standings before the race 
After title contenders Max Verstappen (Red Bull Racing) and Lewis Hamilton (Mercedes) collided on the first lap of the British Grand Prix, Verstappen's lead in the World Drivers' Championship was reduced to eight points. They were followed by McLaren driver Lando Norris a further sixty-four points back, and Hamilton's teammate Valtteri Bottas five points behind Norris.

Further, Mercedes had closed the gap between themselves and Red Bull in the World Constructors' Championship to four points. McLaren occupied third, 122 points behind Mercedes, but fifteen points ahead of Scuderia Ferrari.

Entrants 

The drivers and teams were the same as the season entry list, with no additional stand-in drivers for the race. Robert Kubica drove in the first practice session for Alfa Romeo Racing in place of Kimi Räikkönen.

Tyre choices 
Sole tyre supplier Pirelli allocated the C2, C3, and C4 compounds of tyre to be used in the race.

Practice
Free Practice 1 and 2 took place on 30 July at 11:30 CEST and 15:00 CEST respectively. Free Practice 3 was held on 31 July at 12:00 CEST.

Qualifying
The first qualifying session took place on 31 July at 15:00 CEST. Hamilton qualified in pole position ahead of Bottas and Verstappen. Verstappen would start on the soft tyres after using them in the second segment, while Hamilton and Bottas would both start on the medium tyre compound. Pérez qualified fourth, ahead of Gasly. The second part of qualifying was stopped after a crash by Sainz, caused by a wind gust making the car unstable. Russell failed to progress past the first segment for the first time in 2021. Schumacher did not take part in the session because his car was damaged in a crash during free practice.

Qualifying classification

Notes 
  – Mick Schumacher did not take part in qualifying due to an accident that occurred during the third practice session. He was permitted to race at the stewards' discretion. He also received a five-place grid penalty for an unscheduled gearbox change. This made no difference as he was already due to start the race from last place.

Race

Report 
The race started at 15:00 CEST on 1 August. It was held for seventy laps at the Hungaroring with Lewis Hamilton starting on pole position. Rain before and during the first lap led to all cars starting on intermediate tyres, Antonio Giovinazzi pitted for dry tyres at the end of the formation lap and subsequently started from the pit lane. The race began with major incidents at the first turn on the first lap; Valtteri Bottas braked late, causing him to hit the back of the McLaren of Lando Norris, sending Norris into Verstappen, who suffered major damage but was able to continue. After hitting Norris, Bottas slid into the other Red Bull of Sergio Pérez, taking him out of the race. Lance Stroll also left his braking too late, and attempted to avoid a collision by taking to the grass on the inside, but collided with the Ferrari of Charles Leclerc, who then forced Daniel Ricciardo to spin as a result. When the safety car was called out, Pérez retired. After following two laps under the safety car, the race was red-flagged. Norris then retired under the red flag. The engine in Leclerc's car was written off as it was found to be damaged beyond repair. Verstappen's car had significant damage, greatly hampering his performance. As the cars came into the pit lane to change tyres and come out for the restart, an unsafe release from Alfa Romeo caused Kimi Räikkönen to collide with Nikita Mazepin, taking the Haas driver out of the race. Räikkönen was subsequently given a ten-second time penalty.

On the restart, only race leader Hamilton started from the grid on intermediate tyres; the rest of the grid started from the pits having changed to slick tyres. Hamilton pitted after the fourth lap, putting the Alpine of Ocon into the lead with Vettel chasing close behind. Hamilton made a pit stop for hard tyres on the nineteenth lap, allowing him to undercut Verstappen and Ricciardo when they stopped the following lap. Sainz undercut Latifi and Tsunoda, putting him into third behind Ocon and Vettel. Verstappen overtook Räikkönen to move up into eleventh place. Vettel and Ocon made pit stops for new tyres on the thirty-sixth and thirty-seventh laps, respectively. Hamilton fought his way up to fourth, then pitted on the forty-eighth lap, coming out behind Alonso. Alonso held him back for twelve laps after the fifty-third lap until the Spaniard locked up and Hamilton passed at the first turn. Hamilton overtook the Ferrari of Sainz on the sixty-seventh lap and moved into third. Gasly pitted on the sixty-eighth lap for fresh tyres and got the fastest lap on the last lap of the race. Ocon won the race from Vettel and Hamilton.

This was Ocon and Alpine's first victory, the first Grand Prix win for the Enstone team since the 2013 Australian Grand Prix, when they were known as Lotus F1, and Ocon's first win in any motor race since the 2015 GP3 Series. Ocon credited teammate Alonso for preventing Hamilton from catching him by the end of the race. It also marked the first victory for a French driver driving a French car powered by a French engine since Alain Prost's triumph at the 1983 Austrian Grand Prix driving a Renault car.

The result allowed Mercedes to pass Red Bull for the lead of the  Championship. Williams moved up to eighth in the championship, ahead of Alfa Romeo, after both their drivers scored for the first time since 2018.

As a result of their roles in causing multiple-car collisions at the first turn of the opening lap, Bottas and Stroll were each given five-place grid penalties for the Belgian Grand Prix.

Post-race 
During post-race scrutineering, stewards were unable to extract sufficient fuel from Sebastian Vettel's Aston Martin for a  sample requested by the rules. Vettel was therefore disqualified. This promoted Mercedes’ Hamilton to second and Ferrari's Sainz to third. Aston Martin initially appealed the disqualification, but later withdrew the appeal.

Race classification

Notes
  – Includes one point for fastest lap.
  – Antonio Giovinazzi qualified 14th, but his place on the grid was left vacant as he came into the pit during the formation lap.
  – Sebastian Vettel finished second on track, but was later disqualified because the required  fuel sample could not be extracted from his car during post-race scrutineering.

Championship standings after the race

Drivers' Championship standings

Constructors' Championship standings

 Note: Only the top five positions are included for both sets of standings.

See also 
 2021 Budapest Formula 3 round
 2021 W Series Budapest round

Notes

References

External links 

Hungarian
Hungarian Grand Prix
Hungarian Grand Prix
Hungarian Grand Prix